Peravali is a village in East Godavari district of the Indian state of Andhra Pradesh. The nearest railway station is Tanuku (TNKU) located at a distance of 7.25 Km. Postal index code of this village is 534328

Geography

Peravali is located at NH-16, which comes in between Raavulapalem and Tadepalligudem. Peravali Junction road had a connection to Narasapuram to Nidadavolu State Highway that intercepts NH-16. 

This Village Is Also Famous For Soil Testing & Soil Investigation By saladi family They Started In 1970's In Peravali & All Over In Andhra Pradesh.

Demographics 

 Census of India, Peravali had a population of 5744. The total population constitute, 2838 males and 2906 females with a sex ratio of 1024 females per 1000 males. 581 children are in the age group of 0–6 years, with sex ratio of 969 The average literacy rate stands at 71.18%.

Transportation 

NH216A, Spur road of NH16 passes through Peravali Village.

This road Connects Eluru, Gundugolanu, Bhimadole Pulla, Kaikaram, Chebrolu, Ungaturu, Tadepalligudem, Duvva, Tanuku, Siddantam, Ravulapalem, Vemagiri, Kadiyapulanka, and ends at Rajahmundry.

APSRTC Connects buses service from Eluru, Gundugolanu, Bhimadolu, Pulla, Kaikaram, Chebrolu, Ungaturu, Tadepalligudem, Duvva, Tanuku,  Ravulapalem, Malleswaram, Achanta Penugonda, Narsapuram, Nidadavolu, Rajahmundray  to Peravali village.

Nearest railway stations 
Tanuku railway station (TNKU), Nidadavolu Junction railway station (NDD), Palakollu railway station (PKO), Narasapur railway station (NS), Tadepalligudem railway station (TDD) are the nearest railway station to Peravali village.

References 

Villages in West Godavari district